In baseball, isolated power or ISO is a sabermetric computation used to measure a batter's raw power. One formula is slugging percentage minus batting average.

The final result measures how many extra bases a player averages per at bat.  A player who hits only singles would thus have an ISO of 0.  The maximum ISO is 3.000, and can only be attained by hitting a home run in every at-bat.

The term "isolated power" was coined by Bill James, but the concept dates back to Branch Rickey and his statistician Allan Roth.

See also
 PECOTA

References

Baseball Prospectus Glossary
Baseball Simple : Isolated Power (ISO) Calculator
FanGraphs Sabermetrics Library

Batting statistics